The Agartala Municipal Corporation or AMC is the municipal body which governs and maintains the city of Agartala, the capital of the Indian state of Tripura and is the Third-largest develop city in North-east India. Formed in the year 1871 the oldest municipal body in Northeast India, AMC had a vital role in developing & modernizing the state and managing in its various activities. This civic administrative body administers an area of 76.5 sq km. AMC is headed by Dipak Majumdar the present Mayor of Agartala.

Objective
The Municipal Corporation consists of councillors elected by the residents of the city. The city is divided into municipal wards and each ward elects a councillor to the Council.

The current majority of AMC belongs to the BJP.

The municipal area was 16.012 km² with a population of 1,89,329 at the 2001 census.
The Urban Development Department Notification No.F.2(2)–UDD /2003 dated 2 July 2004 the Agartala Municipal Council has further been extended taking 16 No. of Grams of Dukli R.D.Block, 7 No. of Grams of Mohanpur R.D. Block and 2 No. of Grams of Jirania R.D. Block with an area of 42.83 square kilometers and a population of 178,495. The present municipal building is located near the City center of Agartala location namely Paradise Chowhamani.

An estimated value of the population of Agartala in each decades as shown here from 1961 along with its size in area.

Members of the Mayor-in-Council

Election 

Date: 25 November 2021

Result: 28 November 2021

Total Seats : 51

Winning Party : BJP with 51 seats.

See also 
List of cities and towns in Tripura

References

External links
AMC page

Agartala
Municipal corporations in Tripura
Local government in Tripura
1871 establishments in India